Captain Franciszek Błażej (noms de guerre "Roman", "Bogusław") was born on 27 October 1907 in Nosówka, in Austrian Galicia. He was a professional officer of the Polish Army and participated in the Polish September Campaign. Some time in the early 1940s, he joined the Rzeszów division of the Union for Armed Struggle (later the Home Army).

In 1945, he became a member of the Rzeszów division of the anti-Communist organization, Freedom and Independence (WiN). He was editor-in-chief of the WiN magazine "White Eagle" and, between December 1946 and fall 1947, Błażej was the director of the Southern Department of WiN. Captured by the Ministry of Public Security in November 1947 in Kraków, he was beaten and tortured in the Mokotów Prison for so long that his body started to rot and gangrene set in.

In October 1950, Błażej was sentenced to death. He was executed with a shot to the head on 1 March 1951 and his body was buried in an unknown location.

See also

 Cursed soldiers
 1951 Mokotów Prison execution

References
 https://web.archive.org/web/20110724160700/http://www.rzeszow.uw.gov.pl/main.php?muid=3&mid=127&akID=5022&cid=809070c69fd2cd36
 https://web.archive.org/web/20070903190036/http://www.powstanie-warszawskie-1944.ac.pl/zw_win.htm
 http://www.projectinposterum.org/docs/chodakiewicz3.htm
 WiN | Freedom and Independence - A Historical Brief part 3 by Dr. Janusz Marek Kurtyka, Ph.D., Instytut Pamięci Narodowej, IPN, Poland.

1907 births
1951 deaths
People from Rzeszów County
People from the Kingdom of Galicia and Lodomeria
Home Army members
Cursed soldiers
Nonpersons in the Eastern Bloc
People executed by the Polish People's Republic
Executed military personnel
Executed Polish people
People executed by Poland by firearm